Citizen Jane may refer to:

Books
 Citizen Jane (book), a 1999 true-crime book by James Dalessandro
 Citizen Jane (biography), a 1990 biography of Jane Fonda by Christopher Andersen

Films
 Citizen Jane (2009 film), a 2009 made-for-TV movie directed by Armand Mastroianni
 Citizen Jane (2017 film), a documentary about Jane Jacobs' activism against urban renewal

Other
 "Citizen Jane", a 1987 song by Bernie Taupin from the album Tribe
 Citizen Jane Film Festival, an annual film festival at Stephens College

See also
 Jane Citizen, a female version of John Q. Public
 Citizen Kane, a 1941 American film
 Citizen Joe, a 2005 Stargate SG-1 episode
 Citizen (disambiguation)
 Citizen X (disambiguation)